Frances Fong (born Frances Chung; September 22, 1927 – October 24, 2012) was an American singer and actress whose performing career spanned over fifty years.

Early life
She was born Frances Chung in Honolulu, in what was then the Territory of Hawaii. Her parents, Francis Chung and Emma Leong Chung, were both born in Hawaii to immigrants from China. She had one older brother. Her father started as an electrician repairing appliances in a shop, and later became an executive of a lumber company. When the children were old enough for school, her mother worked as a packer in a pineapple cannery. English was Frances Chung's only language growing up.

Frances Chung attended Kalihi-weana Elementary, Kalakaua Junior High, and Roosevelt High School. At Roosevelt she was active in student government, volunteered in the school library, and was a member of the A Cappella Choir and Swim Club. She also belonged to the school's Allied Youth Organization, for which she was vice-president. During high school Frances Chung took part in USO entertainments in Hawaii, and performed in a continuing community variety show called "The Gay Nineties".

After graduating from Roosevelt High School in June 1945, she attended Long Beach City College (LBCC) on the mainland, studying Dramatics.

MGM contract
After just a few weeks at LBCC, Frances Chung was in a show for war workers at Douglas Aircraft Corporation. Francis Lederer spotted her and brought her to the attention of MGM scouts, who had her tested for a part in Holiday in Mexico.  She got the part and a contract, though her performance wound up on the cutting room floor.

She continued to use Frances Chung as billing for all movies she made while under contract to MGM from 1945 thru 1948, despite having been married in May 1946. She was first loaned to 20th Century for an uncredited bit in Anna and the King of Siam. She was then loaned to Universal for a thirteen part serial, Lost City of the Jungle, her first credited part. Back at MGM in 1947, she was in Dark Delusion (sometimes mistakenly cited as Dark Illusion). For 1948 she was loaned out again, to Paramount for Saigon.  Her final film in 1948 may have been done after her MGM contract finished, an independent production titled Women in the Night. A mildly lurid melodrama, it did provide her with screen credit and newspaper publicity.

Film, TV, and singing
Following 1948 she had no film roles for seven years. She joined a twelve-piece band called "The Cathayans", doing lead vocals for engagements at the St. Francis Hotel and other San Francisco venues. During winter 1953-54 she entered a contest for Miss Chinese New Year Festival, the winner to be determined by which contestant sold the most festival entry tickets. Though not a beauty contest, a photo of her and two other contestants was widely circulated among newspapers around the country.

The publicity led to Frances Fong (as she now billed herself) obtaining parts in at least four episodes of The New Adventures of China Smith during 1954. Her first television work, this series set in Singapore and nearby locales used her in different roles rather than as a recurring character. This led to her next film, Soldier of Fortune, a Hong Kong-based story starring Clark Gable. She didn't receive screen credit, but was mentioned favorably in newspaper reviews. She had another uncredited role in Hell on Frisco Bay (working title The Darkest Hour) which was filmed in April and May 1955, but not released until 1956. Fong had another uncredited bit part in Around the World in 80 Days, plus appearances on television series Navy Log and Cavalcade of America during 1956.

Nightclub work
During 1956 Fong created a nightclub act that played for nineteen months at the New Frontier and seven months at the Thunderbird. The act was built around her singing, with some sultry dance routines and jokes added. She was top billed at San Francisco's Forbidden City during the last quarter of 1958, with local columnists noting whenever she temporarily left to film a show in Hollywood. Fong herself described her routine to an interviewer: "I wear sleek gowns, sing sexy songs. The women don't like it, but the men do." An example of her repartee between the songs and dances: "All I ever meet are Cads driving Jags".

For all her engagements, Fong's contract allowed her time off for television work. Her nightclub wardrobe enhanced her value for television roles in which she played an entertainer. While still at Forbidden City she started working for Warner Brothers Television, doing episodes of 77 Sunset Strip and Lawman. For the former, she was required to speak Chinese over the phone. Since she didn't know the language she started taking lessons, to which fact publicity agents tipped reporters.

TV work 1959-1961
By January 1959 Fong had quit nightclub work in favor of television. For the next three years she had parts in a dozen different TV series, some of them for multiple episodes. She had been cast for recurring roles in two series, Shark Street and Brady, but after filming the pilot episodes both shows remained unsold. Some of the shows she did appear in such as Peter Gunn, Hawaiian Eye,  Bachelor Father, and Perry Mason were quite popular, so that she felt it worthwhile to purchase a modest second home in Van Nuys instead of commuting from San Francisco and staying in hotels.

However, she also did a number of short-lived and single season shows: Yancy Derringer, 21 Beacon Street, Johnny Midnight, The Case of the Dangerous Robin, and Mr. Garlund which only lasted seven episodes. With no series regular or recurring roles on the horizon, Fong decided to take a chance on performing live again, this time in theatre.

Pajama Tops
From June 1962 Fong was involved with a touring company production of the French farce Pajama Tops. So far as is known, this was her only appearance on the stage. The play, adapted from Moumou by Jean de Létraz, had been running steadily for five years in small Los Angeles theaters with an ever-changing cast. Producers Stan Seiden and Zev Buffman decided to take it on tour, beginning with the Moore Theatre in Seattle. That city was then hosting the World's Fair, ensuring large visiting crowds.

The action centered around three "couples" at a Deauville country house, with a diminutive police inspector as odd man out. The touring company cast was small, just seven actors, with John Agar and June Wilkinson as the stars. Fong, as the ambitious maid "Claudine", Cliff Halle, Leslie Vallen, Brad Logan, and Don McArt completed the cast, while Richard Vath directed the action. The broad comedy included many intentional prop mishaps and stage miscues, delighting audiences and appalling critics. After nine SRO weeks in Seattle, the company moved to Miami's Coconut Grove Playhouse, where it set performance records with another nine week run. From there it went to Pittsburgh's Nixon Theatre, then to Kingston, Jamaica, St. Louis, Kansas City, Baltimore, and other cities for two and three week runs.

The year-long tour playing what was essentially a burlesque given a veneer of stage legitimacy took its toll on the players. Director Richard Vath had to take over Agar's part and James Winslow replaced Logan as the butler "Jacques". Fong and Wilkinson had reportedly stopped speaking to each other off-stage. Finally, in a reversal of the usual process, the comedy went to Broadway in late May 1963, where it had 4 previews and 52 performances at the Winter Garden Theatre. Towards the end of the run, Wilkinson deliberately upstaged Fong during the latter's big scene, causing a backstage brawl that left the stage manager, who unwisely tried to intervene, with a sore jaw.

Pajama Tops had occupied over a year of Fong's career and given her the cachet of a Broadway production, albeit one that a critic said "may set the theater back a few millenium". It had also taken her away from Hollywood and television; her last two TV episodes had been filmed in 1961 and it would be 1965 before she returned to the small screen.

Later career
Fong returned to television in 1965, doing two or three series episodes or TV movies each year up to 1982, when her small screen work became much more intermittent. She was now a character actor rather than a leading lady. She had a small part in the John Wayne film Hellfighters during 1968. She was credited with doing three movies in the 1970s and 1980s, Golden Needles, Dragon Force, and Bruce Lee's Dragons Fight Back that may actually have been performed by a much younger Hong Kong based actress with the same name. This may also have been the case with a 1990 episode of a Hong Kong made British television series Yellowthread Street.

Her last film was a bit part in 1998 for Rush Hour, while her last television work was a year later for Martial Law.

Fong died on October 24, 2012; the place and cause of death are not public knowledge.

Personal life
Growing up in Honolulu, Frances Chung was known as a strong swimmer and body surfer. She also liked fishing and sea diving, both of which she was taught by her father. She was fond of Russian cuisine and became adept at cooking it. She took part in a charity auto race and rally along with other celebrities in 1962.

When Frances Chung was first signed to an MGM contract in 1945, she met actor Leslie Fong, who had just appeared in Tokyo Rose. They were married May 18, 1946 in San Francisco, where Fong's family owned a men's clothing store. The couple had two sons, both of whom went into acting: Leslie Howard Fong Jr and Brian Fong (Chase). While married to Leslie Fong, Frances Chung continued to use her birth name for professional credits. The couple divorced after the birth of their second son.

Frances Chung then met and married George Kim Fong, a CPA and USAAF veteran from Oakland, California. They had one son together and maintained a primary residence in San Francisco. It was only after this second marriage that she switched to using "Frances Fong" for professional billing. George and Frances Fong shared an interest in Chinese ceramics; they donated their large collection to the Berkeley Art Museum in 1996.

Filmography

Notes

References

External links

 

1927 births
2012 deaths
American television actresses
20th-century American actresses